Nils Gude (4 April 1859 in Düsseldorf – 24 December 1908 in Christiania) was a Norwegian portrait painter.

Biography
Nils Gude  was the son of the prominent painter Hans Gude (1825–1903) and the brother of diplomat Ove Gude (1853–1910). He was born in  Düsseldorf, Germany where his father was teaching at the Düsseldorf school of painting.
He studied under his father, before entering the Academy of Fine Arts, Karlsruhe in 1877 to study under Eduard Hildebrandt and Karl Gussow. He continued his studies in Berlin 1881–82, and later relocated to Christiania (now Oslo), Norway.

Gude is known for several portraits of prominent figures of the day, including portraits of his own father and of Henrik Ibsen.

References

1859 births
1908 deaths
Norwegian expatriates in Germany
19th-century Norwegian painters
Norwegian male painters
19th-century Norwegian male artists